Evagelia Roussi (born 16 May 1979) is a Greek former professional tennis player.

Roussi featured in a total of nine Fed Cup ties for Greece between 1999 and 2001, winning three singles and one doubles rubber. One of her singles wins came against top 100 player Mariaan de Swardt of South Africa in 2000.

ITF finals

Singles: 1 (0–1)

Doubles: 5 (3–2)

References

External links
 
 
 

1979 births
Living people
Greek female tennis players